Ahsha Rolle and Riza Zalameda were the defending champions, but Zalameda decided not to participate this year. Rolle partnered with Alexandra Mueller, but lost in the first round to Christina Fusano and Courtney Nagle.

Chang Kai-chen and Heidi El Tabakh won the title, defeating Irina Falconi and Amanda Fink 3–6, 6–3, [10–4] in the final.

Seeds

Draw

References
Main Draw

Odlum Brown Vancouver Open
Vancouver Open